Mir Taher Mazloomi (born February 26, 1975, in Tehran) is an Iranian actor and voice actor.

Biography
He is a theater graduate and started his artistic activity by participating in the classes of Professor Saarigian. Mirtaher Mazloumi went to the theater stage for the first time in 1988, and then in 1999, he entered television with the series of so-and-so stories.After that, he entered the cinema in 2001 with the movie Saghi. In addition to acting, Mazloumi is also active in dubbing and has spoken for different characters in many movies. Among the most important works are Gol Mehraboni's works, Oh Fish and Pond, X Large, Samurai in Berlin, Dynamite, Confiscation, Controversy at the Wedding, Two Brides, Nim, Iran Burger, The Season of Puberty, The Sound That Remains, Dismissals, Carnival He mentioned death, when we are all asleep, and the series of nurses, we will relax, Kimia, Rekhneh, Boi Baran, Samdan, Ta Soraya, The 30th Day, The Sheriff, and Rozgar Gharib.

Filmography
Gasht-e ershad 3 2021
Fish and Puddle  2020
Cats city 2    2020
Women Are Angels 2  2020
Noon Khe (TV Series) 
Azhdar 2019
Salhaye Door Az Khane (TV Series)
The Monster (TV Series)
The Samurai in Berlin  2018
X-Large 2018
Confiscation
I Love you 
Jenabe Ali 
Khod Khaaste

Voice acting
Deadly germs 
Just one breath 
Son
Dr. Stockman and Oroko Saki in the cartoon Teenage Mutant Ninja Turtles (2008)
The last accidental hero (2008)
Forgotten (2009)
Criminal (2010)
Lost in Space (2010)
Trickster (2010)
First class porter (2010)
Alternative killers (2010)
Rig Roan 
The Key of Secrets 
The Legend of Zoro 
Hemat 
Tax collectors 
Let's go brother 
My children 
Felicia's trip 
Promise 
Heavenly and Earthly Warriors 
Another kind of loyalty 
El Dorado 
Bobby 
Man in front 
Harry Potter and the Half-Blood Prince (as Albus Dumbledore)
Once upon a time in America (2011)
Painful memories
Child (2011)
Rented Heart 
Man against man (2012)
Arsenic and old tour (2012)
The Mayor's Last Efforts (2008)
The last hurray (2012)
Man's best friend (2008)

Awards
Fadjr International Theater Festival Award for Best Actor - Radio Plays Competition

References

https://sekans.com/en/crew/profile/ypdgZ3Wa/میرطاهر-مظلومی
https://en.kinorium.com/name/1680881/
https://televezoon.com/actor/295/mir-taher-mazloomi.html
https://www.filmoria.co.uk/movie-list/mir-taher-mazloomi-castid1693042
https://en.ifilmtv.tv/Artist/Content/2485

External links

Soureh Cinema
Mir Taher Mazloomi On Persian Wikipedia

Iranian male actors
Iranian male voice actors
Living people
People from Tehran
1975 births
